Michael Edwards (born 18. February 1974) is an Australian composer and pianist based in Berlin. He composes music for Film, TV and Theatre. Edwards is also known for his work with Lisa Gerrard, Dead Can Dance, Skye Edwards, Patrick Cassidy, Darren Hayes, Christian Tschuggnall and the Konzerthausorchester Berlin.

Biography 
Edwards was born in Melbourne, Australia. He studied viola at the Queensland Conservatorium and played in the Queensland Youth Orchestras. In 1993 he won the Australian national Nescafe Big Break Award whilst studying jazz piano at Queensland University of Technology (QUT) in Brisbane. He graduated with a music degree from QUT in 1994 and a graduate diploma in philosophy from the University of Sydney in 1998.

His sister is author and columnist Kasey Edwards.

Career

Music and television 
After relocating to Sydney Edwards began his composition career writing music for advertising and television including writing the theme for the news program Today Tonight.

In 2003 he relocated to London, where he was one half of the production duo Lief, together with Adrian Watkins. They had UK Top 10 chart success with their remixes "Put 'Em High" for StoneBridge and "Cannot Contain This" for Moloko. Some years later Lief completed their own debut album "Photogenic", released in 2017 on Native Music.

Film 
Edwards moved into composing for film after meeting Lisa Gerrard. First collaborating with her on the film Whale Rider. Further collaborations include Layer Cake, the Japanese film Ichi, and the albums The Silver Tree and The Black Opal.

In 2009 he scored the film The Tomb, starring Wes Bentley. Other notable films featuring his music are The Front Line, Fuga Per La Liberta, Kill the Irishman, Calvary and 1916: The Irish Rebellion, all of which he composed in collaboration with Patrick Cassidy.

His score to the award-winning film The Clockmaker's Dream won him Best Music at Los Angeles Cinefest 2016 and a nomination for the Deutscher Filmmusikpreis 2016.

Orchestral work 
Edwards relocated to Berlin in 2009 focusing more heavily on orchestral composition. In 2017 he was commissioned to compose for the Konzerthaus Orchestra Berlin for which he and co-composer Christian Tschuggnall won multiple international nominations and prizes, including the Music and Sound Awards 2017, Golden Award of Montreux, Deutscher Preis für Onlinekommunikation, and Gold at the Cannes Corporate Media and TV Awards 2017.

With Tschuggnall, Edwards runs the music studio "unheard" in Berlin.

Theatre 
Edwards has composed music for multiple theatre-productions. He has worked with Ice and Fire Theatre London and the network Actors for Human Rights in Germany. His work includes the original score for the documentary theatre pieces Rendition Monologues, Asylum Dialogues and NSU-Monologues.

Pianist 
As a live performer and pianist Edwards toured with Dead Can Dance in 2005 and with Skye and Darren Hayes from 2006 till 2008.

Discography

Albums 
 Whale Rider (soundtrack)
 Silver Tree – Lisa Gerrard
 Dead Can Dance – Live 2005
 Ichi (soundtrack)
 Calvary (soundtrack)
 1916: The Irish Rebellion (soundtrack)
 Small Town (soundtrack)
 The Clockmaker’s Dream (soundtrack)
 Skye – In a Low Light
 Atef – Perfect Stranger 
 Volta Music – Embers
 Lief – Photogenic [2017]
 Universal Music – Dark Futures

Feature films 
 1916: The Irish Rebellion
 Calvary 
 Die Gewählten
 Out of Society
 Kill The Irishman
 The Tomb
 Ichi
 Secrets of State
 Solo
 Fuga Per la Liberta
 The Frontline 
 Playing For Charlie 
 Before The Flood 
 Layer Cake 
 Whale Rider
 Breaking the Ice

Singles 
 Space Weaver – Lisa Gerrard (The Silver Tree)
 Sleep – Lisa Gerrard
 Desert Song – Lisa Gerrard
 The Messinger – Lisa Gerrard
 Serpent and the Dove – Lisa Gerrard
 Black Forest – Lisa Gerrard
 Perfect Stranger – Atef
 Said and Done – Skye
 Mise Eire – Sibeal
 Cannot Contain This – Moloko (Lief Remix)
 Put ‘em High – Stonebridge (Lief Remix)

Short films 
 The Clockmaker's Dream
 Narcan
 Klangberlins
 Dead Clean

Television 
 Today Tonight News Theme (1999–2013)
 Water Rats (1999)
 Murder Call (1999) 
 Mandy’s Choice (2006) 
 Town and Country (2005) 
 Katrin und die Welt der Tiere (2010)
 Small Town (2016)

Plays 
 Rendition Monologues – Ice and Fire Theare London
 
 
  – Bühne für Menschenrechte Berlin
 Hypnotise The World – Jan Becker (Germany)
 Loachre –  GAA Ireland

Awards 
 1993: Nescafe Big Break (winner)
 2006: Australian Music Prize (nomination)
 2016: Deutscher Filmmusikpreis (nomination)
 2016: Los Angeles Cinefest (winner)
 2017: Garden State Film Festival (winner)
 2017: Deutscher Preis für Onlinekommunikation (winner)
 2017: Golden Award of Montreux (winner)
 2017: ADC Peaks – Best YouTube Clip 2017 (winner)
 2017: Music and Sound Awards (finalist)
 2017: Cannes Corporate Media and TV Awards (winner)

References

External links 
 
 
 

1974 births
Musicians from Melbourne
Australian expatriates in Germany
Australian pianists
Australian film score composers
Living people
21st-century pianists